Theonesios III of Characene was a king of Characene who ruled from approximately 52AD. His rule is known only by the coins he minted.  
The distribution of his coinage through the region indicates his rule was one of extensive trade.

He was succeeded by Attambelos IV.

References

Year of birth missing
Year of death missing
1st-century deaths
1st-century monarchs in the Middle East
Kings of Characene